Drama City: "What Should I Do?" (드라마 시티: 어떡하지?") is the 234th episode of the South Korean KBS television series, Drama City, which is a collection of single episode short dramas. Each episode has a different story, and the cast changes every week. Seong-ho, played by Lee Joon-gi, lives a poor life with his father, while his ill mother is hospitalized. But suddenly, he is later on transported back into his father's past and discovers more about his parents and how they met.

Synopsis
A rampant boy, whose mother is very ill, has problems coping with his ill mom and doesn't get along with his dad. After one of his arguments with his dad, he runs out of the house to let off steam by playing with his roller blades. Somehow he traveled through time he meets his parents prior to their dating.

Cast
Lee Joon-gi as Seong-ho
Lee Yeong-jung as Park Yong-beom
Lee Eun-hye as Ae-kyeong
Seo Nam-yeong as Kim Yong-tae
Park Hyo-joo as Kyeong-ja

See also
Drama City
List of Korean television shows
Contemporary culture of South Korea

References

External links
Drama City: What Should I Do Official Homepage 
Drama City Homepage (since 2002)
Sunday Best Homepage (until 2002)
Episodes listing (since 2002)
Episodes listing (1999-2001)
Episodes listing (1997-1998)
Korean Wiz

Korean Broadcasting System television dramas
2004 South Korean television series debuts
2004 South Korean television series endings